Sengzhao (or Seng-Chao) (Sōjō; 384–414)
was a Chinese Buddhist philosopher from Later Qin. Born to a poor family in Jingzhao, he acquired literary skills, apparently including the capacity to read Pali, and became a scribe. This exposed him to a variety of uncommon documents. He was influenced by Taoists, Laozi and Zhuangzi, and although we are told he enjoyed Lao Tzu’s Daodejing (Tao-te ching, Dotokyu-kyo), he was overjoyed when he discovered the Vimalakirti Sutra. This encounter transformed his life and he became a Buddhist. He was known as being among the ablest of the disciples of Kumārajīva.

Sengzhao was recognized as both a scholar of high skill and someone of profound understanding relating to religious matters. He was involved in translating Indian treatises, which formed the only source of study for early Chinese Mādhyamika Buddhism. He also authored a small number of texts, but is famous for the book Zhaolun. Its chapters are as follows: Things Do Not Shift, Non-Absolute Emptiness, Prajna Is Without Dichotomizing Knowledge, and Nirvana Is Without Conceptualization.

He is mentioned in the Memoirs of Eminent Monks.

Sengzhao criticized earlier Chinese Buddhist schools for believing in being or non-being. He concluded that all dharmas are empty.

Contribution
He composed a series of treatises published under the title Chao Lun or Zhao Lun, which was first translated (1948) into English as The Book of Chao  by Walter Liebenthal, and later (1968) republished in a revised edition with the revised title of Chao Lun, the Treatises of Seng-chao. .

Later References
A number of other accounts exist concerning the life of Sengzhao, though they rarely shed any new light on his work or activities. The Weishou [a collection of canonical texts] accords Sengzhao preeminence among the eight hundred or so scholars gathered at Chang’an: “Daorong and his fellows were of knowledge and learning all-pervasive, and Sengzhao was the greatest of them. When Kumrajva made a translation, Sengzhao would always take pen in hand and define the meanings of words. He annotated the Vimalakrtinirdesha Stra and also published several treatises. They all have subtle meaning, and scholars venerate them.” (Hurvitz 54)

While adding nothing substantively new, this version highlights Sengzhao's importance as a liaison between the Indian Kumarajiva and the Chinese language. All indications point to the foreign master's reliance on Sengzhao's ability to “translate” the Indian terminology into stylistically acceptable Chinese. The gong’an (meditation puzzle) collection known as the Biyen lu (Blue Cliff Record) contains a tale concerning Sengzhao's death which by all accounts is apocryphal. Despite its spurious legend regarding Zhao's demise, within the gongan commentary supplied by the Chan (“meditation”; Japanese Zen) master Yunmen, we find another reference to his life that provides some insight into his correspondence with Liu Yimin. According to the Biyen lu, Sengzhao not only took Kumrajva as his teacher, but “he also called upon the bodhisattva Buddhabhadra at the Temple of the Tile Coffin, who had come from India to transmit the mind-seal of the twenty-seventh Patriarch. Sengzhao then entered deeply into the inner sanctum.” (Cleary, Thomas, and J.C. Cleary, trans. The Blue Cliff Records. Boulder, CO: Shambala, 1978.)"

Footnotes

Further reading
 Robinson, Richard H. (Oct. 1958 - Jan. 1959). Mysticism and Logic in Seng-Chao's Thought, Philosophy East and West 8 (3/4), 99-120
 Felbur, Rafal, transl. (2017). Essays of Sengzhao, in: Three Short Treatises by Vasubandhu, Sengzhao, and Zongmi, Bukkyo Dendo Kyokai America, pp. 51-135. ISBN 978-1-886439-66-5

External links 
 Sengzhao, by Jeffrey Dippmann, Internet Encyclopedia of Philosophy

384 births
414 deaths
5th-century Chinese philosophers
Sixteen Kingdoms philosophers
Sixteen Kingdoms writers
Chinese spiritual writers
Chinese scholars of Buddhism
Later Qin Buddhists
Writers from Xi'an
Philosophers from Shaanxi
Madhyamaka
5th-century Chinese translators